Charles D. Kolstad (born April 30, 1948) is an American economist, known for his work in environmental economics, environmental regulation, climate change and energy markets. He is Professor and Senior Fellow at Stanford University (appointed in the Stanford Institute for Economic Policy Research, the Precourt Institute for Energy and the Department of Economics).  Prior to his appointment at Stanford, he was Professor of Economics at the University of California, Santa Barbara, appointed to both the Bren School of Environmental Science & Management and the Department of Economics. Kolstad was also Chair of the UCSB Department of Economics and co-director of the University of California Center for Energy & Environmental Economics. He has previously held a wide variety of academic positions, including at the University of Illinois, Harvard University, Stanford University and MIT.

Education
Kolstad holds a Ph.D. from Stanford, an M.A. in mathematics from the University of Rochester, and a B.A. in mathematics from Bates College.

Affiliations
Kolstad is a founding co-editor of the Review of Environmental Economics and Policy, a peer-reviewed journal of environmental economics. He is also a former president of the Association of Environmental and Resource Economists (AERE), and has authored more than 100 publications, including the undergraduate text, Environmental Economics, which has been translated into Japanese, Spanish and Chinese.

Books

References

External links
 Kolstad's homepage

21st-century American economists
Environmental economists
Stanford University alumni
University of Rochester alumni
University of California, Santa Barbara faculty
Stanford University faculty
1948 births
Living people